Bernard Chan may refer to:

Bernard Chan (swimmer) (born 1946), Olympic swimmer from Singapore
Bernard Chan Pak-li (born 1977), politician from Hong Kong
Bernard Charnwut Chan (born 1965), politician and businessman from Hong Kong